Khvor Gardan (also Romanized as Khvor Gardān) is a village in Reza Mahalleh Rural District, in the Central District of Rudsar County, Gilan Province, Iran. At the 2006 census, its population was 12, in 5 families.

References 

Populated places in Rudsar County